India Culture League Education Society (ICLES) Motilal Jhunjhunwala College is one of the colleges situated in Vashi, Navi Mumbai, India. It offers bachelor's degree in number of courses including self finance.

References

External links

Buildings and structures in Navi Mumbai
Education in Navi Mumbai
Universities and colleges in India
Review: